The Sredanci interchange is a cloverleaf interchange east of Slavonski Brod, Croatia. It is named after nearby village of Sredanci. The interchange connects the A5 motorway to the A3 motorway facilitating a link between the city of Osijek and the remainder of the Croatian motorway system. The interchange is a part of Pan-European corridors Vc and X. It also represents a junction of European routes E70 and E73.

There are no exits from the motorway system available at the interchange, thereby allowing the A3 and A5 motorways to have an integrated toll collection system, joined at the interchange.

See also 

 International E-road network
 Transport in Croatia

References

Interchange, Sredanci
Road interchanges in Croatia